Alternative League for Haitian Progress and Emancipation (LAPEH) is a Haitian political party. The party is led by Jude Célestin, and holds four seats in the Chamber of Deputies, while holding no seat in the Senate.

References

2015 establishments in Haiti
Political parties established in 2015
Political parties in Haiti